Markus Obernosterer (born 14 April 1990) is an Austrian footballer who plays as a midfielder for Stuttgarter Kickers. He has played in the 3. Liga with VfB Stuttgart II and in the Austrian 2. Liga with Wacker Innsbruck.

Club career
In the summer of 2019, Obernosterer signed for Stuttgarter Kickers on a two-year contract.

International career
Obernosterer has played for Austria at under-20 level, appearing in a 2–2 draw against Germany under-20 on 13 November 2009.

References

External links
 
 

Living people
1990 births
Austrian footballers
Sportspeople from Innsbruck
Footballers from Tyrol (state)
Association football midfielders
FC Wacker Innsbruck (2002) players
FC Energie Cottbus II players
WSG Tirol players
VfB Stuttgart II players
SV Elversberg players
1. FC Saarbrücken players
Stuttgarter Kickers players
2. Liga (Austria) players
3. Liga players
Regionalliga players
Oberliga (football) players
Austria youth international footballers